St Andrew's College is a co-educational, inter-denominational, international Private day school, founded in 1894 by members of the Presbyterian community, and now located in Booterstown, Dún Laoghaire–Rathdown, Ireland. The school colours are blue and white.

History

Foundation
Founded as a boys' secondary school at the end of the 19th century by members of the Presbyterian community, St Andrew's College celebrated its centenary in 1994. It was on 8 January 1894 that the College opened its doors at 21 St Stephen's Green in the centre of Dublin. This was to be the first of its three locations. The school grew rapidly from its original intake of 69 students. By the end of 1894 there were 203 boys in the school.

Wellington Place
At the beginning of 1937 a move to new premises in Wellington Place, Clyde Road, along with a determined effort by past pupils and parents to stave off closure or amalgamation saw a revival in the fortunes of the College. In 1973, the school became co-educational and moved to a new site in Booterstown.

Structure
St Andrew's College has both a primary and secondary school. The secondary school offers both the Leaving Certificate (Ireland) and the International Baccalaureate programme.

Accreditations
Since 1984, St Andrew's is the only school in Ireland fully accredited by both the European Council of International Schools and the New England Association of Schools and Colleges.

International Baccalaureate
St Andrew's is one of three schools in Ireland to offer the International Baccalaureate (IB) Diploma Programme. A small number (usually around 70) of the school's students are in the IB programme.

Model United Nations 
St Andrew's organises St Andrew's Model United Nations (SAIMUN). It is run over the first week in Easter in the Royal Marine Hotel in Dun Laoghaire.

Sport
The school's sports facilities consist of two hockey pitches, one rugby pitche, two hard tennis courts, 8 lawn tennis courts, an outdoor basketball court, an indoor sports hall and a fitness centre. The major winter sports are rugby, basketball and hockey; the major summer sports are tennis, athletics and cricket along with an inter year annual football competition which runs through the summer term.

Notable former pupils

Leigh Arnold, actress
 Andrew Balbirnie, cricketer
 Wallace Benn, suffragan Bishop of Lewes (1997–2012)
 Shane Berkery, contemporary artist
 Robert Briscoe, first Jewish Teachta Dála (TD) and founding member of Fianna Fáil who also served as Lord Mayor of Dublin
 Maurice E. Dockrell, Fine Gael TD
 E. R. Dodds, classical scholar
 Tom Dreaper, racehorse trainer
 Zlata Filipović, Bosnian writer
 Charles Franklin, Irish-American (naturalised U.S. citizen) motorcycle racer-engineer. He enrolled in 1894, the year the college was founded
 Ruth Gilligan, writer and actress
 Ruth Kearney, actress
 Eve Hewson, actress
 Hector Hughes, Scottish MP
 Herbert Carmichael Irwin, aviator and athlete
 Denis Johnston, writer
 Felix Jones, Ireland rugby union international
 Christopher Juul-Jensen, professional cyclist
 Jordan Larmour, Leinster & Ireland rugby player
 Alan Lewis, Ireland cricketer and rugby union referee
 Katie McGrath, actress
 Alfred Monahan, Bishop of Monmouth (1940-1945)
 David Norris, independent member of Seanad Éireann
 Gillian Pinder, Ireland women's field hockey international and silver medallist at the 2018 Women's Hockey World Cup
 Andrew Porter, rugby player for Leinster & Ireland
 Herbert Rollins, cricketer
 Bethel Solomons, Ireland rugby player, president of the Royal College of Physicians of Ireland, master of the Rotunda Hospital, supporter of the 1916 Rising; mentioned in Finnegans Wake
 Molly Sterling, singer-songwriter
 Peter Sullivan, Connacht Rugby Player
 John Lighton Synge, mathematician and physicist
 Cliff Taylor, Editor, Sunday Business Post
 Chloe Watkins, Ireland women's field hockey international and silver medallist at the 2018 Women's Hockey World Cup  
 Trevor Williams, Bishop of Limerick and Killaloe 
 Juanita Wilson, director

References

External links

Official website
Saint Andrew's International Model United Nations

International schools in the Republic of Ireland
Private schools in the Republic of Ireland
Secondary schools in Dún Laoghaire–Rathdown
Educational institutions established in 1894
Booterstown
1894 establishments in Ireland